John E. Jamian is an American businessman, former U.S. government official, and Michigan State Legislator.  He served as deputy and later acting maritime administrator, the head of the U.S. Maritime Administration, an agency of the United States Department of Transportation, from 2003 until 2006.  He was confirmed as deputy maritime administrator by the Senate on May 7, 2003 and became acting maritime administrator February 12, 2005.  Prior to his service at the Maritime Administration, Jamian was elected to three terms in the Michigan House of Representatives from 1991 to 1996.  From 1997 to 2001 he served as executive director of the Detroit/Wayne County Port Authority and from 2001 until his appointment as deputy director in 2003 as the executive director the Armenian Assembly of America.  Between 2011 and 2015, Jamian resumed his role as executive director at the Port of Detroit.  Since returning to private life in 2015, he has held the position of Chief Operations Officer for Troy, Michigan based AmeriCare Medical Inc. and continues to serve as the Armenian Assembly of America's State of Michigan Director.

Michigan House of Representatives
Jamian entered politics in 1990 when he ran as a Republican candidate for state representative in Michigan's 40th District.  After winning a tightly contested primary and subsequent general election, he was sworn into office in 1991.  Jamian served three terms in the state house, stepping down after 1996 to honor his commitment to term limits.

As a state representative, he chaired the House Health Policy Committee and the House Committee on Port and Maritime Affairs.  He also served as vice chair of the House Insurance Committee and co-chaired the United States Canada Relations Committee for the Midwest Council of State Governments.

Detroit / Wayne County Port Authority
In 1997 John was appointed by Governor John Engler to serve as executive director of the Detroit/Wayne County Port Authority.  During his time at the Port of Detroit, he led the effort to secure a $6.2 Million state grant as part of the Clean Michigan Initiative.  The grant money was used to redevelop portions of the Detroit waterfront, including the construction of the Detroit Riverfront Promenade.

In 2000, Mayor Dennis Archer appointed Jamian to the Detroit 300 Commission as chairman of the "Sail Detroit" Planning Committee.  As chair he was responsible for the planning and organization of a Tall Ships parade, one of the highlight events at Detroit's tricentennial celebration in 2001.

John was reappointed to a second term as Executive Director of the Port of Detroit between 2011 and 2015.

U.S. Maritime Administration
In 2003 Jamian was nominated by President George W. Bush to serve as the deputy maritime administrator for the U.S. Department of Transportation's Maritime Administration.  He was confirmed by the U.S. Senate and assumed his duties on May 7, 2003.  With the resignation of William Schubert on February 12, 2005 Jamian was named Acting Maritime Administrator.

As acting administrator, his responsibilities included oversight of marine transportation policy and port infrastructure programs, working with U.S. Transportation Command on the Marine Security Program, as well as serving as a member of the President's National Presidential Security Directive.  Administratively, Jamian oversaw the daily operations of the Maritime Administration, its 900 employees, 276 ship assets under MARAD purveyance, and the United States Merchant Marine Academy at Kings Point, NY.

During his tenure at MARAD, he created the first USDOT Gateway office on the West Coast, followed by several other key Gateway Office locations, to provide high-level departmental assistance on a local scale and across all modes of transportation.  Also under his leadership, the agency played a pivotal role in rebuilding critical port infrastructure along the Gulf Coast after the devastating impacts of Hurricanes Katrina and Rita.  Other lasting hallmarks include agency initiatives to build stronger maritime relationships with China and Vietnam and efforts toward the creation of a coastal shipping program between the United States, Canada and Mexico.

Jamian resigned his post as Acting Maritime Administrator on May 1, 2006.

Personal information
John lives with his wife in Rochester Hills, Michigan.  They have two children.

References

External links
US Maritime Administration
Detroit / Wayne County Port Authority

|-

1954 births
Living people
People from Southfield, Michigan
Oakland University alumni
American businesspeople
United States Department of Transportation officials
Republican Party members of the Michigan House of Representatives
20th-century American politicians